Nemapogon levantinus is a moth of the family Tineidae. It is found in Syria.

References

Moths described in 1961
Nemapogoninae